Maria Elena Cárdenas-Corona is an American geneticist and microbiologist specialized in cell signaling. She is a scientific review officer in the Center for Scientific Review. Cardenas-Corona is a research professor emeritus of molecular genetics and microbiology at Duke University School of Medicine.

Career 
Cardenas-Corona completed a Ph.D. at University of North Texas in 1988.

Cardenas-Corona was a faculty member of the Duke Cancer Institute and several Duke University graduate programs. She served on NIH study sections and review panels. She was a research professor emeritus of molecular genetics and microbiology at Duke University School of Medicine. During her academic career, her studies focused on the elucidation of the mechanism of action of the anti-cancer, immunosuppressive and anti-aging drug rapamycin, the dissection of its target in the mTORC1 signaling cascade, and the characterization of mTORC1 roles in cell fitness and growth control. Simultaneously, she conducted studies to elucidate the roles of the calcineurin pathway in stress responses and fungal virulence.

After retirement, Cardenas-Corona joined the Center for Scientific Review as a scientific review officer in the division of translational and clinical sciences.

Cardenas-Corona was elected Fellow of the American Association for the Advancement of Science for distinguish scientific contributions to the cell signaling field.

References

External links
 

Living people
Year of birth missing (living people)
Place of birth missing (living people)
University of North Texas alumni
Duke University School of Medicine faculty
National Institutes of Health people
Fellows of the American Association for the Advancement of Science
21st-century American biologists
21st-century American women scientists
American women biologists
American geneticists
American women geneticists
American microbiologists
Women microbiologists
Women medical researchers
American medical researchers